Music West Records was an independent record company founded by Allan Kaplan on December 1985 in San Rafael, California. The company was initially formed to promote Ray Lynch, their first artist. During its run, artists released under the record company included Jim Chappell, Kenneth Nash, Chris Spheeris, and Øystein Sevåg. According to Gary Chappell, the manufacturer for Music West, the artists originated independently, claiming that the company's idea "has a statement that comes directly from the
artist with no interference."

In 1991, the company attempted to break away from their "New Age" roots. In an interview with Billboard on April 1991, Kaplan said "I believe the new age category is shrinking rapidly, but the winning titles–maybe about 200 of them–will continue to sell more than ever." The company attempted to expand the company by releasing tracks from Sun Studios in Kaplan's hometown, Memphis, Tennessee. However, after a lawsuit by Ray Lynch for allegedly not paying him, the company was foreclosed by Security Pacific Bank on November 1991 with all of its assets sold by June 1992.

Artists

 James Asher
 Teja Bell
 Jim Chappell
 Kimbal Dykes
 Ekimi
 Ray Lynch
 Kenneth Nash
 Windsor Riley
 Øystein Sevåg
 Mark Sloniker
 Dallas Smith
 Chris Spheeris
 The Telling
 Paul Voudouris

References

1985 establishments in California
Record labels established in 1985
Defunct record labels of the United States
Record labels disestablished in 1991